As Far as My Feet Will Carry Me (German: So weit die Füße tragen) is a 1959 West German television series which was first broadcast on ARD on six episodes. It is based on the memoirs of Cornelius Rost detailing his escape from a Soviet gulag after being held as prisoner of war. It starred Heinz Weiss as Clemens Forell, the alias used by Rost.

Other actors who appeared in the series include Wolfgang Büttner, Johannes Buzalski, Hans Epskamp and Dietrich Thoms.

References

Bibliography
Christiane Wienand. Returning Memories: Former Prisoners of War in Divided and Reunited Germany. Boydell & Brewer, 2015.

External links
 

Television shows set in Russia
1959 German television series debuts
German-language television shows
German drama television series